Statistics of League of Ireland in the 1980–81 season.

Overview
It was contested by 16 teams, and Athlone Town won the championship.

Final classification

Results

Top scorers

Ireland, 1980-81
1980–81 in Republic of Ireland association football
League of Ireland seasons